Chasing Rainbows: The Road to Oz is a musical with a book by Marc Acito, based on the life of Judy Garland.

Premise
Conceived by Tina Marie Casamento, with musical adaption and arrangements by David Libby the musical follows Judy Garland's early career from vaudeville baby to MGM teen star.

Productions 
The musical premiered at the Flat Rock Playhouse on December 2, 2015 and ran for a limited time through December 19, 2015.

Following a series of workshops and industry labs, it was announced in March 2019 that the show would have its world premiere at the Paper Mill Playhouse. Previews for Chasing Rainbows began on September 26, 2019 at the Paper Mill Playhouse. The world premiere of Chasing Rainbows opened the following month on October 6. The limited run closed on October 27, 2019. Following the Paper Mill Playhouse production, the producers planned to continue workshopping the musical.

Musical numbers
Paper Mill Playhouse

Act 1
 "Shooting High" – Gumm Family
 "Going Hollywood" – Gumm Family & Ensemble
 "Always/Remember" – Frank, Baby & Frances
 "Morning Comes" – Frances
 "This Is a Happy Little Ditty" – Shirley & Students
 "All Ma’s Children" – Joe, Harold, Shirley, Frances, Students & Ma Lawlor
 "Beautiful Girls" – Ethel, Mary Jane, Virginia & Frances
 "Bill" – Frances & Ethel
 "You Made Me Love You" – Ethel & Frank
 "Shooting High (Reprise) " – Joe
 "When You’re Smiling" – Frank & Baby
 "The Business We Call Show" – Virginia, Mary Jane, Frances & Ethel
 "Judy" – George Jessel & Judy
 "I’m Always Chasing Rainbows" – Judy & Frank
 "Hollywood Party/Should I” – Mickey, Judy, Ethel, Frank & Ensemble
 "Il Bacio" – Edna Mae
 "Zing! Went the Strings of My Heart" – Judy
 "Beautiful Girls” (Reprise)" – Mayer, Roger & Kay
 "Everybody Sing" – Judy, Gumm Family & Company

Act 2
 "Optimistic Voices" – Judy & Ensemble
 "Meet the Beat of My Heart/Broadway Rhythm" – Judy, Kay, Buddy & Ensemble
 "Roger’s Coaching" – Roger & Judy
 "I Can’t Give You Anything but Love/Teenage Patter" – Judy & Frank
 "Zing! Went the Strings of My Heart (Reprise)" – Judy
 "Always/Remember (Reprise)" – Ethel, Mary Jane, Virginia & Judy
 "In-Between" – Judy & Roger
 "Swing, Mister Mendelssohn" – Edna Mae, Mickey & Judy
 "Dear Mister Gable/You Made Me Love You" – Judy, Mayer & Kay
 "If/Only" – Kay
 "I’m Always Chasing Rainbows (Reprise)" – Judy & Frank
 "Got a Pair of New Shoes" – Kay, Roger, Mickey, Judy & Ensemble
 "Oz Montage" – Company
 "Over the Rainbow" – Judy

Cast and Characters

References

External links 
 Chasing Rainbows at the Paper Mill Playhouse

2015 musicals
Biographical plays about actors
Biographical musicals
Cultural depictions of Clark Gable
Cultural depictions of Judy Garland
Cultural depictions of Shirley Temple
Hollywood, Los Angeles in fiction
Plays set in the 20th century
Plays set in California